The Twelve Carat Tour is the fourth concert tour by American rapper and singer Post Malone, in support of his fourth studio album Twelve Carat Toothache (2022).  The tour began in Omaha on September 10, 2022 and is currently scheduled to conclude in Amsterdam on May 20, 2023.

Background 
On June 13, 2022, Post announced his fourth concert tour, along with his opener, fellow American rapper and singer Roddy Ricch, who joined him on the European leg of the Beerbongs & Bentleys Tour in 2019. On June 17, additional shows were added in Toronto, Boston, New York City, Inglewood, and Los Angeles.  During the first week of touring, it was announced on Zack Bia's Instagram that he would provide an opening DJ set on the shows Roddy Ricch was absent from.
 
On September 17, 2022, Post was performing at his St. Louis concert when he fell onstage due to a trapdoor for his acoustic guitar not being shut.  Despite the fall, he finished the show in a condensed form and went on with the tour the following night.  A week later, Post had to postpone his second Boston concert to October 10 due to waking up with stabbing pains and cracking noises from the spot which he hit his ribs when he fell onstage the week prior.  He returned to the tour on schedule three nights later even though his hospitalization revealed he had a minor rib fracture.

Set list 
This set list is from the concert on September 11, 2022 in Saint Paul. It is not intended to represent all concerts for the duration of the tour.
 

 "Reputation"
 "Wow."
 "I Like You (A Happier Song)"
 "Wrapped Around Your Finger"
 "Better Now"
 "Psycho"
 "Candy Paint
 "I Fall Apart"
 "Euthanasia"
 "Stay"
 "Go Flex"
 "Circles"
 "Love/Hate Letter to Alcohol"
 "Take What You Want"
 "When I'm Alone"
 "Over Now"
 "Rockstar"
 "Insane"
 "Cooped Up" (with Roddy Ricch)
 "Sunflower"
 "One Right Now"
 "Congratulations"
 
Encore
"White Iverson"

Tour dates

Notes

References 

 

 
2022 concert tours
2023 concert tours
Post Malone